19-Nineteen (lit. "I'm 19 years old") is a 2009 South Korean-Japanese film starring T.O.P, Seungri and Huh E-jae. Three nineteen-year-olds, two boys and a girl, are accused of murder and forced to run away. Everyone, including their parents, believes they are guilty, but the experience strengthens their bond as they attempt to find the real killer and prove their innocence.

It was part of the "Telecinema7" project, seven feature-length mini-dramas which were collaborations between South Korean TV directors and Japanese TV screenwriters; the seven Korea-Japan joint productions both received a limited theater release and were broadcast on television. 19-Nineteen was first released in Korea in CGV theaters on November 12, 2009, and later aired on SBS (South Korea) and TV Asahi (Japan) in 2010.

Plot
After graduating from high school Min-seo (Seungri) fails to get into college. He spends the next year cramming for his entrance exam once again. Jung-hoon (T.O.P) is a university student fresh out of high school. Late one evening, a high school girl dies. Earlier that evening, Min-seo filmed the girl in an internet cafe without her knowing. Min-seo, Jung-hoon, and another girl named Eun-young (Huh E-jae) – who went to the same high school as the dead girl – all become murder suspects in the death of that girl. All three of these young suspects are 19 years old. They don't know each other, but quickly become fugitives from the law. To clear their names they work to uncover the truth behind the girl's death.

Cast
T.O.P as Seo Jung-hoon
Seungri as Park Min-seo
Huh E-jae as Cha Eun-young
Kim Young-ho as Kim Ha-neul
 as Ryu Seon-jae
Jung Sung-il (actor) as Ha Ki-sang
 as Oh Young-ae
 as Seo Chang-man
Oh Jung-won as Seo In-sook
 as Seo Hyang-ja
Choi In-sook as Park Hwa-jung
 as Cha Min-kyung
Jang So-yeon as Yoo Eun-hye

Theme Song
 T.O.P ft Seungri - Because

See also
The Relation of Face, Mind and Love
Heaven's Postman
Triangle
Paradise
After the Banquet
A Dream Comes True

References

External links
 https://web.archive.org/web/20130624215141/http://telecinema7.jp/ 
 http://cafe.naver.com/telecine7/ 
 19-Nineteen at Samhwa Networks 
 
 
 

2009 films
Japanese crime films
South Korean crime films
2000s teen films
South Korean teen films
2000s Japanese films
2000s South Korean films